Sir George Paget Thomson, FRS (3 May 189210 September 1975) was a British physicist and Nobel laureate in physics recognized for his discovery of the wave properties of the electron by electron diffraction.

Education and early life
Thomson was born in Cambridge, England, the son of physicist and Nobel laureate J. J. Thomson and Rose Elisabeth Paget, daughter of George Edward Paget. Thomson went to The Perse School, Cambridge before going on to read mathematics and physics at Trinity College, Cambridge, until the outbreak of World War I in 1914, when he was commissioned into the Queen's Royal West Surrey Regiment. After brief service in France, he transferred to the Royal Flying Corps in 1915 doing research on aerodynamics at the Royal Aircraft Establishment at Farnborough and elsewhere. He resigned his commission as a captain in 1920.

Career
After briefly serving in the First World War Thomson became a Fellow at Cambridge and then moved to the University of Aberdeen. George Thomson was jointly awarded the Nobel Prize for Physics in 1937 for his work in Aberdeen in discovering the wave-like properties of the electron. The prize was shared with the American physicist Clinton Davisson who had made the same discovery independently. Whereas his father had seen the electron as a particle (and won his Nobel Prize in the process), Thomson demonstrated that the electron could be diffracted like a wave. By scattering electrons through thin metallic films (3.10−6 cms) with known crystal structures, such as aluminum, gold and platinum, Thomson found the dimensions of the observed diffraction patterns. In each case, his observed diffractions were within 5 percent of the predicted values given by de Broglie's wave theory. This discovery provided further evidence for the principle of wave–particle duality which had first been posited by Louis-Victor de Broglie in the 1920s as what is often dubbed the de Broglie hypothesis.

Between 1929 and 1930 Thomson was a Non-Resident Lecturer at Cornell University, Ithaca, New York. In 1930 he was appointed Professor at Imperial College London in the chair of the late Hugh Longbourne Callendar. In the late 1930s and during the Second World War Thomson specialised in nuclear physics, concentrating on practical military applications. In particular Thomson was the chairman of the crucial MAUD Committee in 1940–1941 that concluded that an atomic bomb was feasible. In later life he continued this work on nuclear energy but also wrote works on aerodynamics and the value of science in society.

Thomson stayed at Imperial College until 1952, when he became Master of Corpus Christi College, Cambridge. In 1964, the college honored his tenure with the George Thomson Building, a work of modernist architecture on the college's Leckhampton campus.

Awards and honours
In addition to winning the Nobel Prize in Physics, Thomson was knighted in 1943. He gave the address "Two aspects of science" as president of the British Association for 1959–1960.

Personal life

In 1924, Thomson married Kathleen Buchanan Smith, daughter of the Very Rev. Sir George Adam Smith. They had four children, two sons and two daughters. Kathleen died in 1941. Thomson died in 1975 and is buried with his wife in Grantchester Parish Churchyard to the south of Cambridge. One son, Sir John Thomson (1927–2018), became a senior diplomat who served as High Commissioner to India (1977–82) and Permanent Representative to the United Nations (1982–87), and his grandson, Sir Adam Thomson (1955–present), also became a senior diplomat, serving as High Commissioner to Pakistan (2010–2013) and as Permanent Representative to NATO (2014–2016). One daughter, Lillian Clare Thomson, married the South African economist and mountaineer Johannes de Villiers Graaff. 

Thomson died on September 10, 1975 at Cambridge aged 83.

See also
Pinch (plasma physics)
Z-pinch

References

External links

 Annotated Bibliography for George Paget Thomson from the Alsos Digital Library for Nuclear Issues 
 Portraits of Sir George Paget Thomson at the National Portrait Gallery
 George Thomson biography at Wageningen University
A history of the electron: JJ and GP Thomson published by the University of the Basque Country
 
The Papers of Sir George Paget Thomson at the Churchill Archives Centre

1892 births
1975 deaths
20th-century British physicists
Academics of Imperial College London
Academics of the University of Aberdeen
Alumni of Trinity College, Cambridge
Queen's Royal Regiment officers
British Army personnel of World War I
Experimental physicists
British nuclear physicists
Fellows of Corpus Christi College, Cambridge
Fellows of the Royal Society
Knights Bachelor
Nobel laureates in Physics
British Nobel laureates
People educated at The Perse School
People from Cambridge
Anglo-Scots
Royal Medal winners
Presidents of the Institute of Physics
Masters of Corpus Christi College, Cambridge
Howard N. Potts Medal recipients